Events in the year 2019 in Nauru.

Incumbents
 President
 Baron Waqa (until 27 August)
 Lionel Aingimea (after 27 August)
 Speaker of Parliament
 Cyril Buraman (until 27 August)
 Marcus Stephen (after 27 August)

Events 
 8 January – President Waqa becomes the first world leader to visit Taiwan in 2019, and leaders of both countries promise to strengthen relations.
 3 February – Australian Prime Minister Scott Morrison announces that the last four child refugees have left the Australian offshore refugee detention centres, leaving for resettlement in the United States.
 24 March – The Parliament of Nauru, during a visit by Taiwanese President Tsai Ing-wen, passes a resolution rejecting the One China principle.
 16 May – Nauru becomes a member state of the World Meteorological Organization.
 30 May – Ludwig Scotty wins parliamentary by-election in the Anabar Constituency.
 20 July – By the end of the 2019 Pacific Games, Nauru wins 34 medals, with 12 gold medals, 6 silver medals, and 16 bronze medals.
 23 August – A Pakistani refugee in Nauru lights himself on fire.
 24 August – The parliamentary elections and presidential election is held.
 27 August – Lionel Aingimea is sworn in as president.
 28 August – Nauru recognizes Jerusalem as the capital of Israel.
 19 December – Fifteen members of the Nauru 19 are sentenced to jail terms by Judge Daniel Fatiaki after being found guilty in a retrial of charges stemming from a protest in 2015. Charges included rioting and assault.

Deaths
 Sprent Dabwido, former President of Nauru (2011–2013), in Armidale, Australia

References

 
2010s in Nauru
Years of the 21st century in Nauru
Nauru
Nauru